Oikeutta eläimille ("Justice for Animals") is a Finnish animal rights organisation. Founded in 1995, the group engages in lecturing, demonstrations, distributing flyers and other grassroots activism, as well as civil disobedience. In recent years, the organisation has published photographs and videos from undercover investigations of Finnish pig, poultry and fur farms. The images have been widely circulated in the Finnish media, sparking public outrage and calls for the resignation of the Minister of Agriculture, Sirkka-Liisa Anttila. Oikeutta eläimille has also reported several fur farms to the police, and urged Finland to follow the example of fellow Nordic countries Denmark and Sweden and ban fur farming.

References

External links

tehotuotanto.net
sikatehtaat.fi
tarhauskielto.fi

Animal rights organizations
Animal welfare organisations based in Finland
Organizations established in 1995
1995 establishments in Finland